Bulbophyllum refractum is a species of orchid in the genus Bulbophyllum.

References
The Bulbophyllum-Checklist
The Internet Orchid Species Photo Encyclopedia

refractum
Taxa named by Heinrich Zollinger
Taxa named by Heinrich Gustav Reichenbach